What We Leave Behind may refer to:

 What We Leave Behind (film), a 2022 Mexican film
 What We Leave Behind, a 2016 album by Soul Basement
 "What We Leave Behind", an episode from the Television series Arrow

See also
What You Leave Behind
What We Left Behind